Oliver House or Oliver Farm may refer to:

in the United States
(by state)
Ernest McCarty Oliver House, LaFayette, AL, listed on the National Register of Historic Places (NRHP) in Chambers County, Alabama
Oliver House (Bisbee, Arizona), a bed and breakfast in Cochise County, Arizona
Oliver House (Corning, Arkansas), listed on the NRHP in Clay County, Arkansas
Joseph D. Oliver House, South Bend, IN, listed on the NRHP in St. Joseph County, Indiana
Big Spring School-Oliver Farmstead, Settle, KY, listed on the NRHP in Allen County, Kentucky
Oliver House, (Middleborough, Massachusetts), estate built in 1769 by loyalist Dr. Peter Oliver Jr.
Oliver House (Wakefield, Massachusetts)
Captain John Oliver House, Lakeland, MN, listed on the NRHP in Washington County, Minnesota
Oliver Boarding House, Marble, MN, listed on the NRHP in Itasca County, Minnesota
Oliver House (Moscow, Mississippi), listed on the NRHP in Kemper County, Mississippi
Oliver-Leming House, Cape Girardeau, MO, listed on the NRHP in Cape Girardeau County, Missouri
Bennett-Tobler-Pace-Oliver House, Jackson, MO, listed on the NRHP in Cape Girardeau County, Missouri
Thomas Oliver House, Lockport, NY, listed on the NRHP in Niagara County, New York
Beardsley-Oliver House, Olean, NY, listed on the NRHP in Cattaraugus County, New York
Oliver–Morton Farm, Oak Hill, NC, listed on the NRHP in Granville County, North Carolina
Attmore–Oliver House, New Bern, NC, listed on the NRHP in Craven County, North Carolina
Nowell-Mayerburg-Oliver House, Selma, NC, listed on the NRHP in Johnston County, North Carolina
John G. Oliver House, Mentor, OH, listed on the NRHP in Lake County, Ohio
Oliver House, Toledo, Ohio
Oliver House, an alternative name for George Taylor House (Corvallis, Oregon), listed on the NRHP in Benton County, Oregon
Oliver House (Cade's Cove, Tennessee)
Dr. William Holt Oliver House, Bryan, TX, listed on the NRHP in Brazos County, Texas
Owen and Margaret Oliver House, Genesee, WI, listed on the NRHP in Waukesha County, Wisconsin
Joseph B. Oliver House, Milwaukee, WI, listed on the NRHP in Milwaukee County, Wisconsin